Héctor Pastor Bidonde (born March 3, 1937 in La Plata) is a noted Argentine theatre, film and television actor.

He was a shift worker in a tool & dye factory when, in 1954, he was offered a part in Carlos P. Cabral's play Amarretes. He was accepted in the Buenos Aires Province Comedy, in 1964, and performed extensively in the theatre before being offered his first film role in Mario David's La rabona (1978).

Numerous supporting roles followed, among them as that of an unhappily married husband in María Luisa Bemberg's Momoentos (1981) and of a hard-line chief of police in Roberto Denis' Luna Caliente (1985). His roles for director Héctor Olivera as the scheming Suprino in Funny Dirty Little War (1983) and as Dr. Falcone, the father of a student abducted by the police in the fact-based Night of the Pencils (1986) made him prominent in Argentine film.

Bidonde returned to the theatre and to Argentine public television in subsequent years. Among his notable later film performances was in Daniel Barone's Alma mía (1999). Politically active in left-wing politics in Argentina, Bidonde was elected to the Legislature of the City of Buenos Aires in 2003 and was Socialist Workers' Movement candidate Vilma Ripoll's running mate for the 2007 presidential election.

Filmography (partial)
 Chile 672 (2006)
 A cada lado (2005)
 Gallito Ciego (2001)
 Alma mía (1999)
 Nosotros (1993)
 Con la misma bronca (1988)
 Caminos del maíz (1988)
 La Noche de los lápices (1986)  Night of the Pencils
 Perros de la noche (1986)
 Otra historia de amor (1986)
 Sobredosis (1986)
 La Cruz invertida (1985)
 Luna caliente (1985)
 El Sol en botellitas (1985)
 Otra esperanza (1984)
 No habrá más penas ni olvido (1983), a.k.a. Funny Dirty Little War
 Momentos (1981)
 Tiro al aire (1980)
 La isla (1979)
 La rabona (1978)

Television
 Dromo (2009) TV Uniseries.
 El hombre que volvió de la muerte (2007) TV Miniseries.
 1000 millones (2002) TV Series, a.k.a. Love Heritage.
 Los simuladores "El Pequeño Problema del Gran Hombre" (2002) TV Uniseries, a.k.a. Pretenders.
 Culpables (2001) TV Uniseries.
 Gasoleros (1998) TV Series.
 Hombre de mar (1997) TV Series.
 Germán y Patricia (1995) "Alta comedia" 1 Episodi.
 Zona de riesgo (1993) TV Uniseries.
 Estado civil (1990) TV Uniseries.
 El prontuario del Señor K (1987) Especiales de ATC.
 Alguien como usted (1984) TV Series.
 Compromiso (1983) TV Uniseries.
 Dios se lo pague (1981) TV Series.
 El solitario (1980) TV Miniseries.
 Hombres en pugna (1980) Especiales de ATC.

Footnotes

External links
 
 

Argentine male stage actors
Argentine male film actors
Argentine male television actors
Argentine people of French descent
People from La Plata
1937 births
Living people
Argentine actor-politicians
Argentine politicians
20th-century Argentine male actors